Pagodidaphne colmani is a species of sea snail, a marine gastropod mollusk in the family Raphitomidae.

Description

Distribution
This marine species is endemic to Australia and occurs off the Northern Territory.

References

- Shuto, T. 1983. New turrid taxa from the Australian waters. Memoirs of the Faculty of Sciences of Kyushu University, Series D, Geology 25: 1-26 [

External links
 

colmani
Gastropods described in 1983
Gastropods of Australia